Spring Valley Hospital Medical Center is a for-profit hospital is owned by Universal Health Services and operated by Valley Health System. The 364-bed hospital is located in Spring Valley, Nevada.

History
The hospital opened on October 2, 2003.

Leadership
 Leonard Freehof, Chief Executive Officer/Managing Director
 Ryan Moon, Chief Operating Officer
 Patti Gilliano, Chief Nursing Officer
 Laura Allen, Chief Financial Officer
 Joe Mount, Associate Administrator

Criticism and controversy
On July 20, 2012, Brittney Leon was admitted to the hospital because of complications to her pregnancy. She was informed her lesbian partner, Terri-Ann Simonelli, with whom she was registered with the state of Nevada as domestic partners would not be able to make medical decisions for her without a medical power of attorney nor would the hospital keep Simonelli apprised of Leon's status. This is in contravention of Nevada state law, but there is no penalty for the violation.

Services
 32-bed intensive care unit
 Cardiology
 Emergency Services
 Minimally Invasive Surgery
 Rehabilitation
 Spine Program
 The Stroke Center
 Women's Services
 Maternity Center
 Surgery

References

External links
 

2003 establishments in Nevada
Buildings and structures in Spring Valley, Nevada
Hospital buildings completed in 2003
Hospitals established in 2003
Hospitals in the Las Vegas Valley